The Triangle Torch (also known as the East Carolina Torch) was a professional indoor football team playing in North Carolina. The team first played as the Triangle Torch in Raleigh, North Carolina, and was named after the larger Research Triangle region. The Torch started in 2016 as an expansion franchise of American Indoor Football (AIF). The AIF ceased operations and the Torch joined Supreme Indoor Football for the 2017 season. For the 2018 season, the team relocated to Kenansville, North Carolina, as the East Carolina Torch, and joined the American Arena League for its inaugural season. 

The Torch was the third indoor football team to play in Raleigh, after the Carolina Cobras of the Arena Football League (2000–2002) and the Raleigh Rebels of the Atlantic Indoor Football League (2005–2006).

History

In August 2015, it was announced that an American Indoor Football (AIF) expansion team called the Triangle Torch would begin play in Raleigh, North Carolina, with home games to be played in Dorton Arena. The team was originally owned by George Stuphen, whose son played for the Alabama Hammers. Stuphen decided to bring a team to Raleigh due to talent in the area.

The Torch opened up their inaugural season with a 55–33 victory over the Winston Wildcats on March 20, 2016. Following the 2016 season, American Indoor Football ceased operations, and the Torch were left without a league.

In September 2016, Supreme Indoor Football (SIF) listed the Torch as a member. The Torch later confirmed they had joined the SIF on October 28. The team was sold in 2017 to David Foster, Harold Turner, and head coach Chris McKinney.

After going undefeated through the 2017 SIF season, the team lost the championship game to the Cape Fear Heroes. Not long after the game, the Torch announced they would be leaving the SIF. One month later, they were added to the newly formed American Arena League (AAL).  Prior to the start of the 2018 AAL season, the Torch lost owners Harold Turner and David Foster to other business opportunities, leaving coach Chris McKinney as the sole owner from the previous season's ownership transition. In March 2018, the Torch also announced via social media they would have to play the season nearly 90 miles from Raleigh in Kenansville, North Carolina, at the Duplin County Events Center. With the new location, the team changed its name to the East Carolina Torch.

The Torch opened the 2018 season on the road with a 28–38 loss to the High Country Grizzlies before winning their first home game 51–12 over the Upstate Dragons. The team canceled and forfeited their second home game on May 5 against the Cape Fear Heroes. They won 69–6 over the AAL affiliate travel team Carolina Cowboys at home. In the following game at the Richmond Roughriders, they lost and had two players suspended for the rest of the season an illegal low block on a receiver in motion. After a 2–3 record and three home games remaining, the Torch canceled the rest of their 2018 season on May 26.

Following the 2018 season, the Torch began calling themselves the Capital City Torch but, did not have a lease for an arena in the Raleigh area. On November 14, 2018, Torch owner and head coach Chris McKinney was hired by the Cape Fear Heroes as its head coach for 2019 and the Torch shut down operations.

Statistics

Season-by-season results

Head coaches' records
Note: Statistics are correct through the end of the 2018 American Arena League season.

References

External links
East Carolina Torch official website

American Arena League
American football teams in North Carolina
Former American Indoor Football teams
Sports in Raleigh, North Carolina
Duplin County, North Carolina
American football teams established in 2015
American football teams disestablished in 2017
2015 establishments in North Carolina
2017 disestablishments in North Carolina